Tex Whitelocke (born 12 July 1990) is a Caymanian footballer who plays as a forward. He represented the Cayman Islands during World Cup qualifying matches in 2011.

References

Association football forwards
Living people
1990 births
Caymanian footballers
Cayman Islands international footballers
George Town SC players
Cayman Islands under-20 international footballers
Cayman Islands youth international footballers